Shorea calcicola is a species of plant in the family Dipterocarpaceae. The species name is derived from Latin ( = limestone and  = to grow) and refers to the preferred habitat of this species. S. calcicola is endemic to Borneo.

See also
List of Shorea species

References

calcicola
Endemic flora of Borneo
Trees of Borneo
Flora of Sarawak